Maumelle High School is a public secondary school located in Maumelle, Arkansas, United States, for students in grades nine through twelve.  Maumelle is one of four high schools administered by the Pulaski County Special School District and is fed into by Maumelle Middle School.

In addition to Maumelle it serves Crystal Hill.

History
Opened in fall 2011, Maumelle is the newest primary public high school in the Pulaski County Special School District and its 320,000 square foot facilities replace the former Oak Grove High School that closed following the 2010–2011 school year. The school is accredited by AdvancED.

Academics 
Maumelle maintains a cadre of career teaching professionals with several educators qualified as National Board Certified Teachers.  College preparatory offerings include standard and Advanced Placement classes with opportunities for college credit and concurrent credit for college courses.

Fine Arts
Students may participate in various musical and performing arts including: band (e.g., concert band, jazz band), choir (e.g., a cappella, barbershop quartet, beautyshop quartet) and theater (e.g., competitive speech, drama, stagecraft).

Extracurricular activities
The Maumelle High School mascot is the Hornet with the school colors of scarlet and black.

Athletics 
For the 2012–2014 seasons, the Maumelle Hornets and Lady Hornets will participate in the 4A Region 4 Conference. Competition is primarily sanctioned by the Arkansas Activities Association with student-athletes sporting the scarlet and black and competing in baseball, basketball (boys/girls), competitive cheer, competitive dance, football, golf (boys/girls), soccer (boys/girls), softball, tennis (boys/girls), track and field (boys/girls), volleyball and wrestling.

 Wrestling: The wrestling team won the school's first athletic title by capturing the combined 1A-5A state wrestling championship in spring 2013 and repeated in 2014 by a huge margin with 352.5 points breaking the record of most team points, 9 individual state champions, 11 all state wrestlers and the only Arkansas wrestling team to repeat as state champions. 
 Cross country: The boys' cross country team won the 4A state cross country championship in fall 2013 and repeated in the fall of 2014 as 5A champions. The boys' cross country team won the 5A state championship 2016.
 Girls soccer: The girls' soccer team were 4A State Runner Up in the Spring of 2014.
 Boys basketball: The boys' basketball team were 5A State Runner Up in 2015, 2016, and 2021.

Notable alumni

 Darren McFadden (2005–Oak Grove)—American football player; two-time All-American running back; Doak Walker Award (2006, 2007)
 Kendall Donnerson (2015)-NFL player

References

External links
 

Public high schools in Arkansas
Pulaski County Special School District
High schools in Pulaski County, Arkansas
2011 establishments in Arkansas
Educational institutions established in 2011